Karl Eduard Hammerschmidt, also known as Abdullah Bey (1800, Vienna – 30 August 1874, Anatolia), was an Austrian mineralogist, entomologist, and physician.

Life
Hammerschmidt took a law degree in Vienna in 1827. He also studied medicine, with an emphasis on anesthesiology, and served until 1848 as the editor of the  Landwirtschaftliche Zeitung, an agricultural newspaper published in Vienna.

In 1848 he named comadia redtenbacheri, known as the caterpillar placed in bottles of mezcal, in honour of his colleague Ludwig Redtenbacher (1814–1876).

After the Revolution of 1848, Hammerschmidt fled Vienna to fight under the Polish general Józef Bem. Along with other revolutionaries from Hungary, he entered Turkey, and soon thereafter was employed as a teacher of medicine, zoology, and mineralogy in the medical school of Constantinople. Austria demanded that Turkey deport him, whereupon Hammerschmidt moved to Damascus, where he worked as a hospital physician. He served in the Turkish army during the Crimean War.

In 1873, Hammerschmidt joined the faculty of medicine in Istanbul, teaching geology, mineralogy, and zoology. He founded the Natural History Museum of the Imperial Medical School of Constantinople, and was among the founders of the Turkish Red Crescent.

Hammerschmidt converted to Islam and assumed the name "Abdullah Bey." He died in 1874 in the course of geological surveys for a new railway in Anatolia.

Works
 Beschreibung eines neuen mexicanischen Schmetterlinges (Cossus) Redtenbacheri Hmrschdt., dessen Entwickelung in Wien beobachtet wurde, mit 1 lith. Tafel. Wien, 1847
 Helminthologische Beiträge, Beschreibung einiger neuer in Insekten entdeckten Oxyuris-Arten. Wien, 1847.
 Beschreibung einiger Oxyuris-Arten. In: Naturwissenschaftliche Abhandlungen, 1 (1847).

Literature

 Kinzelbach, R. 2013. "Die Vogelsammlung Karl Eduard Hammerschmidt und verschollene Teile der Sammlung des Herzogs Paul Wilhelm, Prinz von Württemberg, am Gymnasium am Kaiserdom zu Speyer und in der Zoologischen Sammlung der Universität Rostock." Vogelwarte 51(2): 81–96.
 Verhandlungen des V. Symposions über Österreichisch - Türkische Medizinische Beziehungen: Anlässlich des 120. Todesjahres des Mitbegründers des Türkischen Halbmondes Dr. Abdullah Bey und des 150. Todesjahres des Schöpfers der Medizinschule Galatasaray Dr. K. A. Bernard. (V. Türk - Avusturya Tibbî İlişkileri Simpozyumu bildirileri: 5 Ekim 1994, Çarşamba; Kızılay'ın Kurucularından Miralay Dr. Abdullah Bey'in ölümünün 120. yıldönümü ile Galatasaray'da Mekteb-i Tıbbiye-i Şahane'nin kurucularından Dr. K. A. Bernard'ın ölümünün 150. yıldönümü anısına düzenlenen yayınlayanlar Arslan Terzioğlu). Türk Avusturya Tıbbî İlişkileri Simpozyumu 5, 1994. Istanbul, 1995.

References 

1800 births
1874 deaths
19th-century Austrian scientists
Austrian mineralogists
Austrian lepidopterists
Austrian anesthesiologists
Hungarian soldiers
Austrian expatriates in Hungary
Austrian expatriates in Turkey
Austrian expatriates in Syria
Scientists from Vienna